Matteo Thun (full name Mathäus Antonius Maria Graf von Thun and Hohenstein, 17 June 1952 Bolzano, Italy) is an Italian architect and designer.

Biography
Matteo Thun was born in Bolzano in 1952 as the first son of the South Tyrolean entrepreneurial family Thun (Lene and Otmar von Thun and Hohenstein), his younger brother Peter took over the management of Thun AG in 1978.

Matteo Thun studied at the Salzburg Academy under Oskar Kokoschka and graduated in 1975 from his architectural studies at the University of Florence. In 1978 he moved to Milan, met Ettore Sottsass and in 1981 co-founded Sottsass Associati and the Memphis Group. In 1984 he founded his own studio and worked for Swatch, whose art director he was from 1990 to 1993. From 1983 to 2000 he was professor of design and ceramics at the "University of Applied Arts" in Vienna. He founded Matteo Thun & Partners, a multicultural architecture and design studio with headquarters in Milan, Italy and a subsidiary in Munich, Germany. The company operates internationally and has been developing hospitality, residential, headquarters, retail and urban design projects and master planning for more than 20 years. Together with his partner Antonio Rodriguez, the office employs 70 experts from the fields of architecture, design and communication. Thun’s wife Susanne has been the trend researcher for the business for 30 years and the couple’s two sons have also picked up artistic professions.

Work (selection)

Architecture 

 1990 - O Sole Mio, prefabricated house;
 2001 - Side Hotel;
 2003 - Vigilius Mountain Resort;
 2006 - Hugo Boss Headquarters Switzerland;
 2008 - Porsche Retail;
 2009 – Power Plant, Biomass;
 2015 - JW Marriott Venice Resort + Spa;
 2017 – International Roll-out IntercityHotels;
 2017 - Waldhotel Medical Health & Excellence.

Design 
Memphis
 1987 - Bulgari watches;
 1986 - Campari glasses; 
 2001 - Illy Cup - Espresso Cups and Cafe Accessories; 
 2002 - Zucchetti- Bath collections;
 2005 - Artemide - Lamp Collections; 
 2008 - ZWILLING J. A. Henckels Kitchenware;
 2011 - Duravit - Bath collections
 2012 - Venini – Vases;
 2013 - Geberit - shower toilet;
 2015 - Klafs - Sauna, Steam; 
 2015 - Axent - shower toilet 
 2017 - Fantini - Bath collections;

Literature 
The index book

Awards
Matteo Thun has received several Wallpaper* Magazine Awards, Red Dot Awards, Good Design Awards, IF Product Design Awards, Green Good Design Awards for his Product Designs.
 
For his Architecture and Interior projects his office has been awarded by Green Good Design Architecture, European Hotel Design Award/Architecture + Interior, Hospitality Design Award, MIPIM Award, Wellness Travel Award.

External links

 Thun's Official site
 The ADI Compasso d'Oro site
 Ettore Sottsass' site

Italian industrial designers
1952 births
Living people
People from Bolzano
Architects from Milan